The Országos Középiskolai Tanulmányi Verseny (OKTV) in Hungarian (rough translation: "National Secondary School Academic Competition") is the most famous high level academic competition for secondary-school students in Hungary (after qualification for Olympiads), whose winners are usually selected for International Student Olympiads, and they often receive gold medals or become Overall Winners. Students 15–18 years old (grades 9–12) compete in the OKTV in various subjects, such as the natural sciences, IT, mathematics, history, philosophy, Hungarian literature and foreign languages. The top competitors receive additional points in the university admissions system. As the number of additional points that one can obtain are capped at 100 and they can be obtained using far less competitive methods, this usually does not advantage the top-performers in the admissions process.

The OKTV has been broadcast on the Australian Christian Channel in Australia.

The competition requirements are increasingly higher than IB's or Hungarian Matura's, also known as érettségi (vizsga), because the solution of these tasks need not only eminent knowledge of facts, but also creativity.

Students in 10th or 11th grade who were granted exemption from taking entrance exams were eligible for a scholarship in one of the United World Colleges. However, these scholarships are open for other applicants, the grade requirements remaining the same.

Education in Hungary
Competitions